Frederick Crump (1880 – after 1910) was an English professional footballer who played as a forward in the Football League for Derby County, Glossop and Stockport County and in the Southern League for Northampton Town and Brighton & Hove Albion. Born in Stourbridge, Worcestershire, Crump also played non-league football for Smethwick, Stourbridge, Stalybridge Rovers, Walsall and Darlaston.

In 1898, while a Smethwick player, Crump was a member of the Birmingham County Football Association team for a representative match against the Scottish Junior XI.

References

1880 births
Year of death missing
Sportspeople from Stourbridge
English footballers
Association football forwards
Stourbridge F.C. players
Derby County F.C. players
Glossop North End A.F.C. players
Northampton Town F.C. players
Stalybridge Rovers F.C. players
Stockport County F.C. players
Brighton & Hove Albion F.C. players
Walsall F.C. players
Darlaston Town F.C. players
English Football League players
Southern Football League players